Bordj Badji Mokhtar is a town and commune in Bordj Badji Mokhtar District, Bordj Badji Mokhtar Province, in south-western Algeria. According to the 2008 census it has a population of 16,437, up from 9,323 in 1998, with an annual growth rate of 6.0%, the highest in the province. It was named after the Algerian independence activist Badji Mokhtar (1919–1954).

The Prime Meridian passes near Bordj Badji Mokhtar.

Geography

The region is extremely sparsely populated with only four significant settlements in the Algerian part (the other three being Timiaouine, In Guezzam and Tin Zaouatine). Unlike most other towns in Saharan Algeria, Bordj Badji Mokhtar is not settled near an oasis but water is available from wells dug  underground.

Climate

Bordj Badji Mokhtar has a hot desert climate (Köppen climate classification BWh), with long, extremely hot summers and short but hot winters, and very little rainfall throughout the year as the town only averages 38 mm (1.5 in) of rainfall. Occasional showers and thunderstorms do occur from July to September due as the town falls under the far northern edge of influence of the West African Monsoon.

<div style="width:85%;">

Transportation

Bordj Badji Mokhtar is very distant from other population centres, but the N6 national highway does connect it to Reggane and Adrar to the north and Timiaouine to the southeast.

Bordj Badji Mokhtar is served by Bordj Badji Mokhtar Airport.

Education

1.2% of the population has a tertiary education, and another 4.4% has completed secondary education. The overall literacy rate is 26.1% (the lowest for any commune in Adrar Province), and is 33.3% among males (the lowest in the province) and 17.8% among females (the second lowest in the province).

Localities
As of 1984, the commune was composed of one locality:
Bordj Badji Mokhtar

References

Neighbouring towns and cities

Communes of Adrar Province
Algeria–Mali border crossings
Adrar Province